James David Melka (born January 15, 1962) is a former linebacker in the National Football League.

Biography
Melka was born on January 15, 1962, in West Allis, Wisconsin. He attended West Allis Central High School where he was an All-America running back.

Career
Melka played at the collegiate level at the University of Wisconsin-Madison and was named to the All-Big Ten team twice. He was drafted in the twelfth round of the 1985 NFL Draft by the Tampa Bay Buccaneers but broke his navicular bone in his wrist playing in a pickup basketball game. He was placed on waivers on August 19, 1985, and would later go on to be a member of the Green Bay Packers.

See also
List of Green Bay Packers players

References

People from West Allis, Wisconsin
Players of American football from Wisconsin
American football linebackers
Wisconsin Badgers football players
1962 births
Living people
Sportspeople from the Milwaukee metropolitan area
Green Bay Packers players